ROIR Dub Sessions is a compilation album by American composer Bill Laswell, released on November 18, 2003 by ROIR.

Track listing

Personnel 
Adapted from the ROIR Dub Sessions liner notes.
Bill Buchen – percussion (2)
Aïyb Dieng – percussion (4)
Gigi – vocals (4)
Graham Haynes – cornet (2)
Karsh Kale – percussion (4)
Bill Laswell – bass guitar, drum programming, keyboards, effects, musical arrangements, producer 
Robert Musso – programming (1)
Style Scott – drum programming (2)
Nicky Skopelitis – guitar (2, 3)
Jah Wobble – bass guitar (3)

Release history

References

External links 
 ROIR Dub Sessions at Bandcamp
 ROIR Dub Sessions at Discogs (list of releases)

2003 compilation albums
Bill Laswell compilation albums
Albums produced by Bill Laswell
ROIR compilation albums